Thomas Skog Martinussen (born 5 February 1995) is a Norwegian footballer midfielder who plays for Ullern IF in the 3. divisjon.

He played several seasons for Aalesund in Tippeligaen, but never really broke into the first team, and joined third-tier club Brattvåg IL in the summer of 2016.

Career statistics 

Source:

References

External links

1995 births
Living people
Sportspeople from Ålesund
Norwegian footballers
Norway youth international footballers
Aalesunds FK players
Brattvåg IL players
Ullern IF players
Eliteserien players
Norwegian Second Division players
Norwegian Third Division players
Association football midfielders